Qarah Qayah (also known as Qarāqīah) is a village in Afshar Rural District, in the Central District of Takab County, West Azerbaijan Province, Iran. At the 2006 census, its population was 494, in 83 families.

References 

Populated places in Takab County